A Place to Call Home is a 1987 television film about Liz Gavin and her eleven children, who relocate from Houston, Texas, to Australia.

References

External links

Australian television films
1987 television films
1987 films
American films based on actual events
Films set in Houston
Films shot in Houston
Films directed by Russ Mayberry
Australian films based on actual events